Gobelins may refer to:

 Gobelin, the name of family of dyers, established from the 15th century
 Gobelins Manufactory, a historic tapestry factory in Paris, France
 Gobelins, l'École de l'image, a school of visual communication and arts in Paris, France
 Les Gobelins (Paris Métro), a station 
 Les Gobelins, a former name and nickname of football club Paris 13 Atletico

See also
 
 Moravská gobelínová manufaktura, a tapestry factory in the Czech Republic
 Goblin (disambiguation)